Conor Doherty (born 22 November 1990) is an Irish Gaelic footballer from Galway. Doherty played his club football with Tuam Stars and county football for the Galway senior football team from 2011 to 2013.

He was Right Half Back on the Galway Minor team that won the All-Ireland Minor Football Championship in 2007.

Doherty previously played with the Galway U21 team who won the All-Ireland defeating Cavan.

Honours
College
Connacht Colleges Senior Football Championship (2): 2007, 2008

County
Connacht Minor Football Championship (1): 2007
All-Ireland Minor Football Championship (1): 2007
Connacht Under-21 Football Championship (1): 2011
All-Ireland Under-21 Football Championship (1): 2011

References

1990 births
Living people
Gaelic football goalkeepers
Galway inter-county Gaelic footballers
People from Galway (city)
Tuam Stars Gaelic footballers